The Cedars Union is a 501 (c) 3 non-profit arts organization located in the Cedars neighborhood of Dallas, TX. Their mission is to "provide resources including studios, tools, programs, and pro-bono services for creatives, foster a collaborative and supportive artist community, and advance the arts in North Texas." The Bowdon Family Foundation bought the Boedeker Building, the eventual property for The Cedars Union, in 2014.

Locations

The Cedars Union Annex 
The Cedars Union is currently housed in the Cedars Union Annex building adjacent to The Boedeker Building. Spanning 7,000 sq. feet, the arts incubator houses micro-studios, a Mac lab, a PC lab, a wood shop, a 3D printer, and other tools for artists.

Studio Artists CoHort 1 

 Riley Holloway 
 Melissa Drumm 
 Laura Lawson
 Kevin Owens
 Hatziel Flores
 Jeremy Biggers
 Fari Rahimi
 Sheryl Anaya
 Shawn Saumell
 Joel Murray

Studio Artists CoHort 2 

 Brantly Sheffield
 Carolyn Sortor
 Cat Rigdon
 Catherine Cornelius
 Elizabeth Hill
 James Talambas
 Jessica Baldivieso
 Jessica Hilvitz
 Kathryn Vestal
 Kristin Moore
 Lisa Horlander
 Lori Maclean
 Mari Pohlman
 Michelle Hinojosa
 Rachel Walter

The Boedeker Building 
The Cedars Union plans to eventually expand into the Boedeker Building, originally an ice cream plant. The Boedeker Building is sometimes used to host events such as Art Conspiracy and SOLUNA. Their May 2018 collaboration with SOLUNA featured interdisciplinary artist and former professional figure skater Jennifer Wester in her piece titled Breaking Shadows. 
In 2020, Erika Jaeggli's exhibition, Flesh & Bone, garnered the Cedars Union a TACA pop-up grant.

References

Arts organizations based in Texas